This is a list of former Maryland Terrapins college football players who have been selected in the NFL Draft.

Key

Selections

Footnotes

References

Maryland

Maryland Terrapins NFL draft